Amin Younes (born 6 August 1993) is a German professional footballer who plays as a winger for Dutch club Utrecht, on loan from Saudi Arabian club Al-Ettifaq, and the Germany national team.

Younes started his youth career at SG Unterrath, before moving to Borussia Mönchengladbach's youth side aged 8. In 2011 he made his debut for the reserve team, Borussia Mönchengladbach II, before making his debut for the senior team in 2012. After a one-season loan spell at 1. FC Kaiserslautern, Younes moved to Dutch club Ajax in 2015, with whom he was runner-up at the 2016–17 UEFA Europa League. In 2018 Younes moved to Italian side Napoli on a free transfer.

Born in Germany to a German mother, Younes also holds Lebanese citizenship on the basis of having a Lebanese father. He represented Germany at youth level between 2008 and 2015, and the senior team since 2017. Younes was part of the squad that won the 2017 FIFA Confederations Cup.

Club career

Borussia Mönchengladbach
Born in Düsseldorf to a former Lebanese footballer and a German mother, Younes played as a youth for SG Unterrath. In 2000, at the age of 8, he joined the youth setup of Bundesliga side Borussia Mönchengladbach. In 2011, he made his debut for Borussia Mönchengladbach II, the reserve team, playing in the Regionalliga West.

Younes made his senior team debut at the end of the 2011–12 Bundesliga, coming on as a substitute against Hannover 96 on 1 April 2012.

1. FC Kaiserslautern (loan)
In August 2014, Younes joined 2. Bundesliga club 1. FC Kaiserslautern on a season-long loan.

Ajax

On 16 July 2015, Younes signed a three-year contract for Dutch club Ajax, until 30 June 2018, with an option for an additional year for €2,5 million. After an injury, which kept him out for the start of the championship, he made his debut as a starter against Groningen (2–0) on 26 September. The following week he scored his first goal for Ajax, against PSV in a 1–2 defeat. Over the weeks, the player found continuity and concluded his first season with eight goals and nine assists in 35 total games. On 20 October 2016, he scored his first goal in a UEFA competition by scoring against Celta Vigo (2–2) in the UEFA Europa League. At the end of the season he played in the 2017 UEFA Europa League final lost to Manchester United. Younes was the player with the most dribbles in the competition.

Napoli
In July 2018 Younes moved to Serie A side Napoli on a free transfer. When Younes moved to Napoli, he requested number 34 shirt in tribute to former Ajax teammate Abdelhak Nouri, who collapsed and suffered brain damage, ending his career. His league debut came on 8 December 2018, against Frosinone in a 4–0 win. Younes' first goal for Napoli, and in the Serie A, came on 17 March 2019, in a 4–2 home victory over Udinese.

Eintracht Frankfurt
On 3 October 2020, Eintracht Frankfurt announced the signing of Younes on a two-year loan from Napoli with an option to buy. On 18 January 2022, the loan was terminated early by consent from Younes, Eintracht and Napoli.

Al-Ettifaq
On 23 January 2022, Younes signed a contract with Al-Ettifaq in Saudi Arabia until 2024.

Utrecht
On 31 August 2022, Younes joined Utrecht in the Netherlands on loan for the 2022–23 season.

International career
Eligible to also represent Lebanon through his father, Joachim Löw called Younes up to the German national team for the first time on 17 May 2017, as part of the squad for the 2017 FIFA Confederations Cup.

His senior debut came on 6 June 2017, coming on as a substitute in a 1–1 draw with Denmark. Younes scored his first goal for the national team in a 2018 FIFA World Cup qualifier against San Marino on 10 June 2017. On 29 June 2017, he scored his second goal in the 2017 FIFA Confederations Cup semi-final game against Mexico, which Germany won 4–1. Germany were crowned champions after beating Chile 1–0 in the final.

Personal life 
Younes was born in Germany to a Lebanese father from Tripoli, Zoulfikar – who also played football, and a German mother, Astrid. Younes has an older brother named Phillip, who plays amateur football, and a younger brother named Carim. During the summer, Younes usually visits his family from his father's side in Lebanon. He is a practicing Muslim.

Style of play 
A technical forward, Younes' main characteristics are his dribbling, pace, and vision of play.

Career statistics

Club

International

Scores and results list Germany's goal tally first.

Honours
Ajax
 UEFA Europa League runner-up: 2016–17

Jong Ajax
 Eerste Divisie: 2017–18

Napoli
 Coppa Italia: 2019–20

Germany
 FIFA Confederations Cup: 2017

Individual
 UEFA Europa League Squad of the Season: 2016–17

References

External links

 
 
 

1993 births
Living people
Footballers from Düsseldorf
German footballers
Germany youth international footballers
Germany under-21 international footballers
Germany international footballers
Association football midfielders
Borussia Mönchengladbach players
Borussia Mönchengladbach II players
1. FC Kaiserslautern players
1. FC Kaiserslautern II players
AFC Ajax players
Jong Ajax players
S.S.C. Napoli players
Eintracht Frankfurt players
Ettifaq FC players
FC Utrecht players
Regionalliga players
Bundesliga players
2. Bundesliga players
Eerste Divisie players
Eredivisie players
Serie A players
Saudi Professional League players
2017 FIFA Confederations Cup players
FIFA Confederations Cup-winning players
German expatriate footballers
Expatriate footballers in Italy
Expatriate footballers in the Netherlands
Expatriate footballers in Saudi Arabia
German expatriate sportspeople in Italy
German expatriate sportspeople in the Netherlands
German expatriate sportspeople in Saudi Arabia
German people of Lebanese descent
Lebanese people of German descent
German Muslims
Lebanese Muslims